Edmund Charles Spencer (25 September 1896 in Adelaide, South Australia – 26 January 1999 in Gnowangerup, Western Australia) was an Australian World War I veteran. He was awarded Knight of the Legion of Honour ("Chevalier de l'Ordre de la Légion d'Honneur"), a class of the highest French order, by French Consul-General to Australia Jean-Claude Poimboeuf on 29 October 1998.

See also
List of foreign recipients of the Légion d'Honneur

References

Australian military personnel of World War I
Australian centenarians
Men centenarians
Chevaliers of the Légion d'honneur
1896 births
1999 deaths
People from Adelaide